Kompassi (Estonian for "Compass") is a subdistrict in the district of Kesklinn (Midtown), Tallinn, the capital of Estonia. It has a population of 2,066.

The Estonian Firefighting Museum is located in Kompassi inside a former fire department on Raua street.

Gallery

References

Subdistricts of Tallinn
Kesklinn, Tallinn